The following is a list of episodes from Criss Angel Mindfreak. A total of 96 episodes have aired.

Season 1 (2005)

Criss Angel Mindfreak Season 1 premiered on the A&E network on Wednesday July 20, 2005. It consists of 18 episodes.

"Burned Alive": Criss faces one of people's biggest fears, he will be burned alive in the streets of Las Vegas
"Levitation": Criss takes a random spectator and levitates them 360 degrees on downtown Fremont Street in Las Vegas.
"Wine Barrel Escape": Criss will devise a plan to top Houdini's milk can escape, being handcuffed and hung eight stories above the ground before the wine barrel falls after the two-minute mark.
"SUV Nail Bed": Criss will lie on a bed of nails as a four-and-a half-ton SUV Hummer drives over his body.
"Body Suspension": Criss is suspended from a helicopter while hanging from four fish hooks as he is flown over the Valley of Fire.
"Buried Alive": Criss does what no one would even consider doing, being buried alive.  With little oxygen, Criss must escape and slither out of solid ground.
"Hellstromism": Criss Angel is challenged by a Las Vegas desert Dodge dealership to find a hidden key for a Dodge Viper using hellstromism.
"Building Walk": In this episode, Criss will lean over the side of the 55th floor of the Aladdin Hotel and will walk down the side without any safety.
"Blind": Criss will drive Mandy Moore to one of her favorite restaurants while blindfolded.
"C4 Crate": Criss will be locked in an explosives filled crate and will experience the power of C4.
"Radio Prediction": In this episode, Criss will attempt to predict a major news event, as well as the lottery.
"Chicken": Criss has the Amazing Jonathan take a car and run him over through a brick wall. He will also perform a knife test in a sushi bar.
"Tesla Strike": Criss will journey out to Baraboo, Wisconsin, and test out one of the largest Tesla coils in the country.
"Uncut": In this unedited episode, Criss will go back to some of the craziest and most insane moments of the series.  Also, never before seen footage and outtakes of Criss' most talked-about illusion: the trash can.
"Up Close": Get up close and get an inside look at the characters of the show, including Criss's surreal family. Also, Criss shows more never before seen footage.
"Halloween Special": Criss is handcuffed and nailed into a wood coffin. He must get out before being pulled through a woodchipper.

Season 2 (2006)

Criss Angel Mindfreak Season 2 premiered on the A&E network on Wednesday May 31, 2006. It consists of 22 episodes.

"Building Float": Criss takes Criss Angel Mindfreaks season 1 episode "Levitation" to a whole new level.  He will float from one building to another in front of a random crowd in broad daylight.
"Walk on Water": Criss will attempt to walk across an entire pool while people swim below and around him.
"Vanish": In this episode, Criss will vanish a spectator 360 degrees by thousands of witnesses in the middle of Las Vegas' Fremont Street.
"Easy Rider": Criss is chained and sealed inside a wooden box filled with explosives. He must escape before a stunt car rams into him in front of a large crowd.
"Party": Criss and crew put incredible insane illusions into Sin City's nightlife scene.  He will then put his hand right through a passerby.
"Animal Magic": Criss will make a four-and-a half-ton Asian elephant vanish in the middle of the street surrounded by spectators.
"In Two": Criss Angel will demonstrate his version of being cut in half without covers, boxes or trick clothing.
"Bike Jump Vanish": In this episode of Mindfreak, Criss will hit a  ramp bike jump into the air and vanish.
"Celebrity Minds": Criss will use hypnosis techniques to drop crowds and put restaurant patrons and staff under his control.
"Sucker": Criss demonstrates psychic surgery and warns us of scammers that like to prey on the innocent. He will blow the lid off anyone who uses magic to take advantage of others.
"Celebrity Seance": In the Amargosa Hotel in Death Valley Junction known for ghostly spirits, Criss invites guests in and tries to connect with forces beyond our comprehension.
"Metamorphosis": In front of thousands of spectators, Criss demonstrates one of the fastest metamorphoses ever attempted.
"Motorcycle Roulette": On Long Island, New York, Criss shares his passions for motorcycles and makes one vanish and reappear.
"Back to School": In this episode, when Criss goes back to school, he freaks out the students and teachers and shows how to mindfreak your friends. It has been stated by students and staff at East Meadow High School that only one scene takes place at the school and the others at another school or studio.
"Prophecy":  Criss predicts the outcome of a motor speedway race and does close up magic in his favorite hometown diner.
"Chad's Story": Criss helps a young magician, Chad Juros, achieve his dream of performing as a Las Vegas headliner.
"Military Salute": This episode features mentalism, sleight of hand and other grand illusions. Criss visits Vandenberg Air Force Base and makes a Hummer appear from nowhere.
"Straightjacket Keelhaul": Attempting to survive, Criss is towed through the ocean and has to escape a straitjacket before being drowned alive.
"Shark Cage Escape": Pushed overboard and sunk to the bottom of the sea, Criss must escape a shark cage with but one breath.
"Magician of the Year": Included with some ultimate feat of mentalism, a pre-recorded DVD will leave the magic community floored.
"Underwater Car Escape": Tied and locked into the trunk of a car, Criss is lowered into a lake and must escape before he runs out of air or drowns.

Season 3 (2007)

Criss Angel Mindfreak Season 3 premiered on the A&E network on Tuesday June 5, 2007. It consists of 25 episodes: 19 episodes that aired on television, and six episodes that were only released on the Collector's Edition Megaset DVD box set.

In addition to this, he will levitate down the largest atrium in the world and make his motorbike transform into three girls.
"Steamroller": Criss will lie on a bed of broken glass as a steamroller rolls over his body.
"Prisoner Transport Escape": After being locked in a mailbag, Criss will attempt to escape a caged truck filled with explosives before it runs off the edge of a cliff (Criss suffered a neck injury during the attempted escape, causing filming to be stopped for three weeks. He vowed never to attempt this stunt again). Also, he will make himself levitate over a tree in a golf court.
"Screwed": With a row of 12 18-inch screwdrivers, Criss will proceed to walk on every one of them barefoot.
"Motorhead": In this episode, Criss highlights cars, trucks and bikes in his illusions. He will turn a Bentley into a Lamborghini and vanishes his Lamborghini while driving it at a high speed.
"Animal 2": The elephant that Criss made vanish in season 2 will amaze us with his animal illusions by making it reappear.
"Quad Drag Escape": Distracted by the news of his mother's heart surgery, Criss must escape while being bound and dragged by an ATV in the Excalibur Hotel and Casino arena.
"Raging Bull": Criss will attempt to vanish before a raging Mexican bull charges him.
"Car Crash Escape": A car parked with explosives and Criss chained to the side will leave him less of a chance to escape free before a speeding car plows into him.
"Sucker 2": In Season 2, Criss introduced us to scammers and charlatans.  This time, he will show more and reveal the ultimate secret, the words that unlock the key to attaining anything you desire.
"Drowned": In this episode, Criss runs into some serious trouble attempting one of Houdini's famous water escapes.
"Naked Jail Escape": Criss has just two hours to escape from a jail cell before a mob of fans busts him in his birthday suit.
"Burning Man": Criss is led by illusionist Jeff McBride on a rite of passage and a dangerous feat involving fire, and discusses Southwestern Native American rites of passage with mentalist Paul Draper.
"Rollercoaster Thru Criss": Tied to the tracks of a speeding rollercoaster, Criss must escape before the coaster hits him or passes through him. A random lady he hypnotizes also passes through Criss' body. Carrot Top is also featured in a trick.
"The Loyal": Criss pays tribute to the loyal and shocks some of his admirers. He makes a car appear from thin air giving it to one of his fans.
"The Kid In Criss": Criss decides to be a kid again and goes back to being young.  He dresses up as Santa Claus, and makes a truck full of toys appear from nowhere.
"Mentalism": In this episode, Criss will attempt to teleport a group of people from one elevator to another in one continuous shot.
"Cement Block": Cement is poured into a Plexiglas container that holds Criss five stories high and gives him 24 hours to escape before it crashes to the ground.
"Seance": In this creepy episode, filmed at The Artisan Hotel in Las Vegas, Criss attempts to bridge the world between the living and the dead and proves he can walk on the ceiling. He asks a spectator to think of a name that appears on his skin written in blood. Criss also gets possessed in this episode, but is it real or is it fake?

Unaired season 3 episodes (Collector's Edition Megaset exclusives)
These six episodes were previously unreleased, and were only available in the Criss Angel Mindfreak: Collector's Edition Megaset.
"Mayhem in the Making": This episode will chronicle a day in the life of Criss Angel as he attempts to shoot an episode of Criss Angel Mindfreak. Criss will make a room transform into the hottest party in Vegas.
"Thunderbirds": Criss will make six fighter jets appear from thin air on a runway.  Criss also gets his new Mindfreak III chopper.
"H2O Teleportation": Criss will vanish from a yacht to instantly reappear on the beach in front of beachgoers.
"Mexico Barrel Escape": Criss is suspended hundreds of feet above the ocean in a barrel before being dropped.  The barrel crashes to the sea leaving only one question: did Criss survive?
"Most Memorable Mindfreak Moments": Criss, along with tons of celebrity guest stars, will go back to some of the most memorable Criss Angel Mindfreak moments when Criss performed more of his most insane illusions.
"Fantasy": In this episode of Criss Angel Mindfreak, Criss will hypnotize a mass crowd of people to remove their clothes in public.

Season 4 (2008)

Criss Angel Mindfreak Season 4 premiered on the A&E network on Wednesday July 23, 2008. It consists of 18 episodes.

In addition to this, he vanished before getting hit from a car and appeared from inside the car.
"Building Implosion":  With a one-hour live special Mindfreak episode, the nine-story Spyglass hotel in Clearwater, FL was loaded with explosives, leaving Criss to escape before it implodes to the ground. The live stunts were presented by Welsh actor and TV host Tim Vincent.
"Skeptic":  Placing several advertisements and postings seeking those who are skeptical of Criss's abilities, Criss invites these skeptics to be part of a deadly challenge.
"Nail Gun":  In this episode, Criss attempts to catch a nail traveling at 1,400 feet per second, and uses a jigsaw to cut through a fan's arm.
Given the chance to escape before it is set to automatically release, the barrel will crash to the ground.
"Cremation":  In a horrifying episode of Mindfreak, spectators will watch before their eyes as Criss is laid on a wooden slab to be cremated alive.
"Spirits of New Orleans":  Criss visits New Orleans and trances bystanders utilizing the mysticism and culture of the city.
"Escape Over Bourbon Street":  With thousands of spectators surrounding Bourbon Street, Criss is completely secured in two straitjackets, shackled and hung upside down above the crowd before attempting to escape.
"Impenetrable":  Criss will make the impossible become reality once again when he attempts to merge through metal and pass from one oil drum to another.
"Close Up": Criss demonstrates the art of close-up magic. Experts discuss the history, the techniques, and the fun that goes with the magic genre.
"Premonition": Using his ability to connect with people, Criss attempts to transfer energy through the TV screen to millions of people at home.
"In Your Face": Criss receives a surprise visit from Playboy's The Girls Next Door. He invites them along and stuns them as he performs various unexplainable up close and in your face magic.
"Mindfreaking With the Stars": Criss runs into his good friend Gene Simmons. With a friendly 1 million dollar bet, Criss challenges Gene to witness a feat of mentalism. If he fails the challenge, he will lose the 1 million dollars.
"Tronik": Criss still loves toys; in the spirit of this, he transforms a toy Hummer into a real Hummer and recreates the highlight of his Broadway show.
"Billionaire Prediction":  With his powerful mind, Criss will describe unknown personal details and predict events before they take place.  He will also read a list of items and attempt to predict what viewers at home would pick.
"24-Hour Birthday Bash":  Criss is known for surprising over 1,000 people over four seasons of Criss Angel Mindfreak, this time his crew and celebrity friends will turn the tables on him and throw the biggest surprise, all behind closed doors for more than 24 hours.
"Car Wreck Vanish":  On a special episode of Criss Angel Mindfreak, Criss and Sully go out on a road trip for the greatest time of their lives.  In a car filled with explosives, a handcuffed Criss must escape or pull off the greatest illusion before he is pronounced roadkill. Kurt Angle appeared on this episode.
"Silverton Final Attempt":  Criss reattempts a demonstration that he was not allowed to do in Season 3. This time he will make it all up to the loyals and escape from being chained and confined in a locked box underwater.

Season 5 (2009)
Criss Angel Mindfreak Season 5 premiered on the A&E network Wednesday August 12, 2009. The season is known as The Five Lives of Criss Angel Mindfreak. It is only five episodes long.

"White Death" - Criss takes the "Buried Alive" escape attempt to an unprecedented level, adding the extra weight and freezing temperatures of snow and ice. Criss will be locked in a glass coffin with handcuffs and will be lowered six feet beneath the snow. Then he has to get out of the handcuffs and dig his way through the snow before hypothermia sets in.
"Death Field" - Criss attempts to safely traverse a field of live explosives where the potential for serious injury, if not death, is extremely high.
"Mass Levitation" - Criss takes levitation to new heights by levitating an entire Las Vegas crowd.
"Terminal Velocity" - Criss will attempt to perform a transposition where he will drop an object from a building and catch it before it touches the ground. Then he will take his transposition skills to a whole new level by vanishing himself and his 220 lb. bike while he is inside a cage which is hanging from a crane. Then he will simultaneously reappear himself with the bike somewhere else.
"Death Crash" - Criss, along with Kurt Angle, will be locked in one of five coffins while a 3-ton automobile will be employed to smash them to splinters, one at a time.

Season 6 (2010)
Criss Angel Mindfreak Season 6 premiered on the A&E network Wednesday August, 4th 2010. It is six episodes long.

"Grand Canyon Death Jump" - Criss attempts to jump the Grand Canyon on a high-performance hybrid motorcycle. He will either miraculously appear inside a locked cage dangling from a helicopter or plummet  to his death.
"Cement Shoes" - An homage to Harry Houdini’s most dangerous escape, Criss is chained and shackled with more than 100 feet of chains and more than 20 locks and lowered 90 feet from the side of the London Bridge in the cold, murky water of Lake Havasu, Arizona in front of 12,000 spectators. To make the escape even more impossible and drowning an almost certainty, Criss has his feet imbedded in a barrel of cement before being lowered off the bridge and deep into the lake below.
"100 Gone" - Criss will attempt to set a Guinness World Record for the largest vanish of people in history. One hundred people are chosen at random and shackled together in front of a crowd of thousands at the Luxor Convention Arena and Criss attempts to make them all disappear instantaneously.
"Smash" - At the monumental Grand Canyon Sky Walk, in front of more than 1,000 onlookers, Criss is shackled and locked inside a confining solid crate except for holes to view his face and hands at all times. The crate is then hoisted over the edge of the canyon more than 4,200 feet above the Colorado River. Criss reveals his process of escape but if he does not succeed in time, he will fatally crash to the rocky depths below.
"Levitation Vanish" - With Criss's chaotic schedule, including his live performance of BeLIEve 10 times each week, the taping of his hit TV series and moving into Serenity, his new home, Criss decides to escape the city for the Valley of fire deep into the Mojave desert. In this remote and mystical place, Criss will attempt to miraculously levitate more than  up into the sky and then vanish.

Criss Angel Mindfreak